Center Township is one of nine townships in Marion County, Indiana, in the United States. As of the 2010 census, its population was 142,787 and it contained 76,872 housing units. It is the most populated township in Marion County.

Center Township includes downtown Indianapolis and part of Beech Grove.

Geography

Municipalities 
 Beech Grove (northern quarter)
 Indianapolis (partial)

Communities
 Belmont at 
 Clifton at 
 Fountain Square
 Ingallston at 
 Martindale-Brightwood
 North Indianapolis at 
 Riverside
 South Village
 Woodruff Place at

Extinct communities
 Babe Denny at 
 Brightwood at 
 Clifford Park at 
(These towns are listed as "historical" by the USGS.)

Cemeteries
The township contains five notable cemeteries: Concordia, Crown Hill, Hebrew, Holy Cross and Saint Joseph, and New Crown.

Major highways
  Interstate 65
  Interstate 70

Airports and landing strips
 ISHC Landing Pad
 Indiana Department of Natural Resources Airport
 Indianapolis Downtown Heliport
 Methodist Hospital Helistop

Lakes
 Sullivan Lake

Notable people
 Julia Carson, former U.S. Representative and onetime Center Township Trustee.
 André Carson, current Representative for Indiana's 7th Congressional District, grandson of Julia Carson.

School districts
 Beech Grove City Schools
 Indianapolis Public Schools

Political districts
 Indiana's 7th congressional district
 State House District 100
 State House District 86
 State House District 96
 State House District 97
 State House District 98
 State House District 99
 State Senate District 31
 State Senate District 32
 State Senate District 33
 State Senate District 34
 State Senate District 35
 State Senate District 36

References
 
 United States Census Bureau 2008 TIGER/Line Shapefiles
 IndianaMap

External links
 Official Website of Center Township
 Indiana Township Association
 United Township Association of Indiana
 City-Data.com page for Center Township

Townships in Marion County, Indiana
Geography of Indianapolis
Townships in Indiana